The marathon is a long-distance foot race with a distance of , usually run as a road race, but the distance can be covered on trail routes. The marathon can be completed by running or with a run/walk strategy. There are also wheelchair divisions.  More than 800 marathons are held throughout the world each year, with the vast majority of competitors being recreational athletes, as larger marathons can have tens of thousands of participants.

The marathon was one of the original modern Olympic events in 1896. The distance did not become standardized until 1921. The distance is also included in the World Athletics Championships, which began in 1983. It is the only running road race included in both championship competitions (walking races on the roads are also contested in both).

History

Origin 

The name Marathon comes from the legend of Philippides (or Pheidippides), the Greek messenger. The legend states that, while he was taking part in the Battle of Marathon, which took place in August or September, 490 BC, he witnessed a Persian vessel changing its course towards Athens as the battle was near a victorious end for the Greek army. He interpreted this as an attempt by the defeated Persians to rush into the city to claim a false victory or simply raid, hence claiming their authority over Greek land. It is said that he ran the entire distance to Athens without stopping, discarding his weapons and even clothes to lose as much weight as possible, and burst into the assembly, exclaiming νενικήκαμεν (nenikēkamen, "we have won!"), before collapsing and dying. 

The account of the run from Marathon to Athens first appears in Plutarch's On the Glory of Athens in the 1st century AD, which quotes from Heraclides Ponticus's lost work, giving the runner's name as either Thersipus of Erchius or Eucles. This is the account adopted by Benjamin Haydon for his painting , published as an engraving in 1836 with a poetical illustration by Letitia Elizabeth Landon. Satirist Lucian of Samosata gave one of the earliest accounts similar to the modern version of the story, but its historical veracity is disputed based on its tongue-in-cheek writing and the runner being referred to as Philippides and not Pheidippides.

There is debate about the historical accuracy of this legend. The Greek historian Herodotus, the main source for the Greco-Persian Wars, mentions Philippides as the messenger who ran from Athens to Sparta asking for help, and then ran back, a distance of over  each way. In some Herodotus manuscripts, the name of the runner between Athens and Sparta is given as Philippides. Herodotus makes no mention of a messenger sent from Marathon to Athens, and relates that the main part of the Athenian army, having fought and won the grueling battle, and fearing a naval raid by the Persian fleet against an undefended Athens, marched quickly back from the battle to Athens, arriving the same day.

In 1879, Robert Browning wrote the poem Pheidippides. Browning's poem, his composite story, became part of late 19th century popular culture and was accepted as a historic legend.

Mount Pentelicus stands between Marathon and Athens, which means that if Philippides actually made his famous run after the battle, he had to run around the mountain, either to the north or to the south. The latter and more obvious route matches almost exactly the modern Marathon-Athens highway (EO83–EO54), which follows the lay of the land southwards from Marathon Bay and along the coast, then takes a gentle but protracted climb westwards towards the eastern approach to Athens, between the foothills of Mounts Hymettus and Penteli, and then gently downhill to Athens proper. However, there have been suggestions that Philippides might have followed another route: a westward climb along the eastern and northern slopes of Mount Penteli to the pass of Dionysos, and then a straight southward downhill path to Athens.

Modern Olympic marathon 

When the modern Olympics began in 1896, the initiators and organizers were looking for a great popularizing event, recalling the glory of ancient Greece. The idea of a marathon race came from Michel Bréal, who wanted the event to feature in the first modern Olympic Games in 1896 in Athens. This idea was heavily supported by Pierre de Coubertin, the founder of the modern Olympics, as well as by the Greeks. The Greeks staged a selection race for the Olympic marathon on 22 March 1896 (Gregorian) that was won by Charilaos Vasilakos in 3 hours and 18 minutes (with the future winner of the introductory Olympic Games marathon, Spyridon "Spyros" Louis, coming in fifth at a second race two weeks later). The winner of the first Olympic marathon, on 10 April 1896 (a male-only race), was Spyridon Louis, a Greek water-carrier, in 2 hours 58 minutes and 50 seconds. The marathon of the 2004 Summer Olympics was run on the traditional route from Marathon to Athens, ending at Panathinaiko Stadium, the venue for the 1896 Summer Olympics. That men's marathon was won by Italian Stefano Baldini in 2 hours 10 minutes and 55 seconds, a record time for this route until the non-Olympics Athens Classic Marathon of 2014, when Felix Kandie lowered the course record to 2 hours 10 minutes and 37 seconds.

The women's marathon was introduced at the 1984 Summer Olympics (Los Angeles, USA) and was won by Joan Benoit of the United States with a time of 2 hours 24 minutes and 52 seconds.

It has become a tradition for the men's Olympic marathon to be the last event of the athletics calendar, on the final day of the Olympics. For many years the race finished inside the Olympic stadium; however, at the 2012 Summer Olympics (London), the start and finish were on The Mall, and at the 2016 Summer Olympics (Rio de Janeiro), the start and finish were in the Sambódromo, the parade area that serves as a spectator mall for Carnival.

Often, the men's marathon medals are awarded during the closing ceremony (including the 2004 games, 2012 games and 2016 games).

The Olympic men's record is 2:06:32, set at the 2008 Summer Olympics by Samuel Kamau Wanjiru of Kenya (average speed about ). The Olympic women's record is 2:23:07, set at the 2012 Summer Olympics by Tiki Gelana of Ethiopia. The men's London 2012 Summer Olympic marathon winner was Stephen Kiprotich of Uganda (2:08:01). Per capita, the Kalenjin ethnic group of Rift Valley Province in Kenya has produced a highly disproportionate share of marathon and track-and-field winners.

Marathon mania 
The Boston Marathon began on 19 April 1897, and was inspired by the success of the first marathon competition in the 1896 Summer Olympics. It is the world's oldest run annual marathon, and ranks as one of the world's most prestigious road racing events. Its course runs from Hopkinton in southern Middlesex County, to Copley Square in Boston. Johnny Hayes' victory at the 1908 Summer Olympics also contributed to the early growth of long-distance running and marathoning in the United States. Later that year, races around the holiday season including the Empire City Marathon held on New Year's Day 1909 in Yonkers, New York, marked the early running craze referred to as "marathon mania". Following the 1908 Olympics, the first five amateur marathons in New York City were held on days that held special meanings: Thanksgiving Day, the day after Christmas, New Year's Day, Washington's Birthday, and Lincoln's Birthday.

Frank Shorter's victory in the marathon at the 1972 Summer Olympics would spur national enthusiasm for the sport more intense than that which followed Hayes' win 64 years earlier. In 2014, an estimated 550,600 runners completed a marathon within the United States. This can be compared to 143,000 in 1980. Today marathons are held all around the world on a nearly weekly basis.

Inclusion of women 
For a long time after the Olympic marathon started, there were no long-distance races, such as the marathon, for women. Although a few women, such as Stamata Revithi in 1896, had run the marathon distance, they were not included in any official results. Marie-Louise Ledru has been credited as the first woman to complete a marathon, in 1918. Violet Piercy has been credited as the first woman to be officially timed in a marathon, in 1926.

Arlene Pieper became the first woman to officially finish a marathon in the United States when she completed the Pikes Peak Marathon in Manitou Springs, Colorado, in 1959. Kathrine Switzer was the first woman to run the Boston Marathon "officially" (with a number), in 1967. However, Switzer's entry, which was accepted through an "oversight" in the screening process, was in "flagrant violation of the rules", and she was treated as an interloper once the error was discovered. Bobbi Gibb had completed the Boston race unofficially the previous year (1966), and was later recognized by the race organizers as the women's winner for that year, as well as 1967 and 1968.

Distance 

The exact length depended on the route established for each venue.

1908 Olympics 

The International Olympic Committee agreed in 1907 that the distance for the 1908 London Olympic marathon would be about 25 miles or 40 kilometers. The organizers decided on a course of 26 miles from the start at Windsor Castle to the royal entrance to the White City Stadium, followed by a lap (586 yards 2 feet; 536 m) of the track, finishing in front of the Royal Box. The course was later altered to use a different entrance to the stadium, followed by a partial lap of 385 yards to the same finish.

The modern  standard distance for the marathon was set by the International Amateur Athletic Federation (IAAF) in May 1921 directly from the length used at the 1908 Summer Olympics in London.

IAAF and world records 

An official IAAF marathon course is 42.195 km (42 m tolerance only in excess). Course officials add a short course prevention factor of up to one meter per kilometer to their measurements to reduce the risk of a measuring error producing a length below the minimum distance.

For events governed by IAAF rules, it is mandatory that the route be marked so that all competitors can see the distance covered in kilometers. The rules make no mention of the use of miles. The IAAF will only recognize world records that are established at events that are run under IAAF rules. For major events, it is customary to publish competitors' timings at the midway mark and also at 5 km splits; marathon runners can be credited with world records for lesser distances recognized by the IAAF (such as 20 km, 30 km and so on) if such records are established while the runner is running a marathon, and completes the marathon course.

Marathon races 

Annually, more than 800 marathons are organized worldwide. Some of these belong to the Association of International Marathons and Distance Races (AIMS) which has grown since its foundation in 1982 to embrace over 300 member events in 83 countries and territories. The marathons of Berlin, Boston, Chicago, London, New York City and Tokyo form the biennial World Marathon Majors series, awarding $500,000 annually to the best overall male and female performers in the series.

In 2006, the editors of Runner's World selected a "World's Top 10 Marathons", in which the Amsterdam, Honolulu, Paris, Rotterdam, and Stockholm marathons were featured along with the five original World Marathon Majors events (excluding Tokyo). Other notable large marathons include United States Marine Corps Marathon, Los Angeles, and Rome. The Boston Marathon is the world's oldest annual marathon, inspired by the success of the 1896 Olympic marathon and held every year since 1897 to celebrate Patriots' Day, a holiday marking the beginning of the American Revolution, thereby purposely linking Athenian and American struggle for democracy. The oldest annual marathon in Europe is the Košice Peace Marathon, held since 1924 in Košice, Slovakia. The historic Polytechnic Marathon was discontinued in 1996. The Athens Classic Marathon traces the route of the 1896 Olympic course, starting in Marathon on the eastern coast of Attica, site of the Battle of Marathon of 490 BC, and ending at the Panathenaic Stadium in Athens.

The Midnight Sun Marathon is held in Tromsø, Norway at 70 degrees north. Using unofficial and temporary courses, measured by GPS, races of marathon distance are now held at the North Pole, in Antarctica and over desert terrain.

A few marathons cross international and geographical borders. The Istanbul Marathon is the only marathon where participants run over two continents (Europe and Asia) during the course of a single event. In the Detroit Free Press Marathon, participants cross the US/Canada border twice. The Niagara Falls International Marathon includes one international border crossing, via the Peace Bridge from Buffalo, New York, United States to Fort Erie, Ontario, Canada.

On 20 March 2018, an indoor Marathon took place in the Armory in New York City. The 200 m track saw a world record in the women's and men's field. Lindsey Scherf (USA) set the indoor women's world record with 2:40:55.  Malcolm Richards (USA) won in 2:19:01 with a male indoor world record.

Wheelchair division 

Many marathons feature a wheelchair division. Typically, those in the wheelchair racing division start their races earlier than their running counterparts.

The first wheelchair marathon was in 1974 in Toledo, Ohio, won by Bob Hall in 2:54. Hall competed in the 1975 Boston Marathon and finished in 2:58, inaugurating the introduction of wheelchair divisions into the Boston Marathon. From 1977 the race was declared the US National Wheelchair championship. The Boston Marathon awards $10,000 to the winning push-rim athlete. Ernst van Dyk has won the Boston Marathon wheelchair division ten times and holds the world record at 1:18:27, set in Boston in 2004. Jean Driscoll won eight times (seven consecutively) and holds the women's world record at 1:34:22.

The New York City Marathon banned wheelchair entrants in 1977, citing safety concerns, but then voluntarily allowed Bob Hall to compete after the state Division of Human Rights ordered the marathon to show cause. The Division ruled in 1979 that the New York City Marathon and New York Road Runners club had to allow wheelchair athletes to compete, and confirmed this at appeal in 1980, but the New York Supreme Court ruled in 1981 that a ban on wheelchair racers was not discriminatory as the marathon was historically a foot race. However, by 1986 14 wheelchair athletes were competing, and an official wheelchair division was added to the marathon in 2000.

Some of the quickest people to complete a wheel-chair marathon include Thomas Geierpichler (Austria) who won gold in men's T52-class marathon (no lower limb function) in 1 hr 49 min 7 sec in Beijing China, on 17 September 2008; and, Heinz Frei (Switzerland) who won the men's T54 marathon (for racers with spinal cord injuries) in a time of 1 hr 20 min and 14 sec in Oita, Japan, 31 October 1999.

Statistics

World records and world's best 
World records were not officially recognized by the IAAF until 1 January 2004; previously, the best times for the marathon were referred to as the 'world best'. Courses must conform to IAAF standards for a record to be recognized. However, marathon routes still vary greatly in elevation, course, and surface, making exact comparisons impossible. Typically, the fastest times are set over relatively flat courses near sea level, during good weather conditions and with the assistance of pacesetters.

The current world record time for men over the distance is 2 hours 1 minute and 09 seconds, set in the Berlin Marathon by Eliud Kipchoge of Kenya on 25 September 2022, an improvement of 30 seconds over the previous record also set in the Berlin Marathon by Eliud Kipchoge, on 16 September 2018.

The world record for women was set by Brigid Kosgei of Kenya in the Chicago Marathon on 13 October 2019, in 2 hours 14 minutes and 4 seconds who broke the record Paula Radcliffe of Great Britain had set over 16 years earlier at the London Marathon.

All-time individual top 25
The following is a list of best times among the Top 25 individuals who ever ran the marathon distance. Subsequent times for each athlete are noted below the table. The data is correct .

Notes
Eliud Kipchoge (Kenya) ran a time of 1:59:40.2 at the Ineos 1:59 Challenge in Vienna on 12 October 2019. This event was run with no other competitors, and with the assistance of fuel and hydration on demand, and in-out pacemakers. Therefore, the attempt was not eligible for official ratification. This was faster than his previous assisted run of 2:00:25 at the Nike Breaking2 in Monza on 6 May 2017, which was also ineligible.
Geoffrey Mutai (Kenya) ran a time of 2:03:02 at the Boston Marathon on 18 April 2011 that was run on an assisted course (in the case of Boston, a point-to-point, net downhill course in excess of the standards) and is therefore ineligible for record purposes per IAAF rule 260.28
Moses Mosop (Kenya) ran a time of 2:03:06 at the Boston Marathon on 18 April 2011 that was run on an assisted course and is therefore ineligible for record purposes per IAAF rule 260.28

Below is a list of all other times equal or faster than 2:03:55:
Eliud Kipchoge also ran 2:01:39 (2018), 2:02:37 (2019), 2:02:40 (2022), 2:03:05 (2016), 2:03:32 (2017).
Kenenisa Bekele also ran 2:03:03 (2016).
Birhanu Legese also ran 2:03:16 (2020).
Wilson Kipsang Kiprotich also ran 2:03:23 (2013), 2:03:42 (2011).
Amos Kipruto also ran 2:03:30 (2020).
Tamirat Tola also ran 2:03:40 (2022)
Dennis Kimetto also ran 2:03:45 (2013).
Emmanuel Mutai also ran 2:03:52 (2013).

Notes
Below is a list of all other times equal or faster than 2:18:11:
Brigid Kosgei also ran 2:16:02 (2022).
Ruth Chepngetich also ran 2:17:08 (2019), 2:17:18  (2022).
Paula Radcliffe also ran 2:17:18 (2002), 2:17:42 (2005).
Yalemzerf Yehualaw also ran 2:17:26  (2022).
Rosemary Wanjiru also ran 2:18:00 (2022).
Joyciline Jepkosgei also ran 2:18:07  (2022).

Season's Bests

Oldest marathoner 
Fauja Singh, then 100, finished the Toronto Waterfront Marathon, becoming the first centenarian ever to officially complete that distance. Singh, a British citizen, finished the race on 16 October 2011 with a time of 8:11:05.9, making him the oldest marathoner. Because Singh could not produce a birth certificate from rural 1911 Colonial India, the place of his birth, his age could not be verified and his record was not accepted by the official governing body World Masters Athletics.

Johnny Kelley ran his last full Boston Marathon at the documented age of 84 in 1992. He previously had won the Boston Marathon in both 1935 and 1945 respectively. Between 1934 and 1950, Johnny finished in the top five 15 times, consistently running in the 2:30s and finishing in second place a record seven times at Boston. A fixture at Boston for more than a half century, his 1992 61st start and 58th finish in Boston is a record which still stands today.

Gladys Burrill, a 92-year-old Prospect, Oregon woman and part-time resident of Hawaii, previously held the Guinness World Records title of oldest person to complete a marathon with her 9 hours 53 minutes performance at the 2010 Honolulu Marathon. The records of the Association of Road Racing Statisticians, at that time, however, suggested that Singh was overall the oldest marathoner, completing the 2004 London Marathon at the age of 93 years and 17 days, and that Burrill was the oldest female marathoner, completing the 2010 Honolulu Marathon at the age of 92 years and 19 days. Singh's age was also reported to be 93 by other sources.

In 2015, 92-year-old Harriette Thompson of Charlotte, North Carolina, completed the Rock 'n' Roll San Diego Marathon in 7 hours 24 minutes 36 seconds, thus becoming the oldest woman to complete a marathon. While Gladys Burrill was 92 years and 19 days old when she completed her record-setting marathon, Harriette Thompson was 92 years and 65 days old when she completed hers.

English born Canadian Ed Whitlock is the oldest to complete a marathon in under 3 hours at age 74, and under 4 hours at age 85.

Youngest marathoner 
Budhia Singh, a boy from Odisha, India, completed his first marathon at age five. He trained under the coach Biranchi Das, who saw potential in him. In May 2006, Budhia was temporarily banned from running by the ministers of child welfare, as his life could be at risk. His coach was also arrested for exploiting and cruelty to a child and was later murdered in an unrelated incident. Budhia is now at a state-run sports academy.

The youngest under 4 hours is Mary Etta Boitano at age 7 years, 284 days; under 3 hours Julie Mullin at 10 years 180 days; and under 2:50 Carrie Garritson at 11 years 116 days.

Participation 
In 2016, Running USA estimated that there were approximately 507,600 marathon finishers in the United States, while other sources reported greater than 550,000 finishers. The chart below from Running USA provides the estimated U.S. Marathon Finisher totals going back to 1976.

Marathon running has become an obsession in China, with 22 marathon races in 2011 increasing to 400 in 2017. In 2015, 75 Chinese runners participated in the Boston Marathon and this increased to 278 in 2017.

Multiple marathons 
As marathon running has become more popular, some athletes have undertaken challenges involving running a series of marathons.

The 100 Marathon Club is intended to provide a focal point for all runners, particularly from the United Kingdom or Ireland, who have completed 100 or more races of marathon distance or longer. At least 10 of these events must be United Kingdom or Ireland Road Marathons. Club chairman Roger Biggs has run more than 700 marathons or ultras. Brian Mills completed his 800th marathon on 17 September 2011.

Steve Edwards, a member of the 100 Marathon Club, set the world record for running 500 marathons in the fastest average finish time of 3 hours 15 minutes, at the same time becoming the first man to run 500 marathons with an official time below 3 hours 30 minutes, on 11 November 2012 at Milton Keynes, England. The records took 24 years to achieve. Edwards was 49 at the time.

Over 350 individuals have completed a marathon in each state of the United States plus Washington, D.C. and some have done it as many as eight times. Beverly Paquin, a 22-year-old nurse from Iowa, was the youngest woman to run a marathon in all 50 states in 2010. A few weeks later, still in 2010, Morgan Cummings (also 22) became the youngest woman to complete a marathon in all 50 states and DC. In 2004, Chuck Bryant of Miami, Florida, who lost his right leg below the knee, became the first amputee to finish this circuit. Bryant has completed a total of 59 marathons on his prosthesis. Twenty-seven people have run a marathon on each of the seven continents, and 31 people have run a marathon in each of the Canadian provinces.

On 25 September 2011, Patrick Finney of Grapevine, Texas became the first person with multiple sclerosis to finish a marathon in each state of the United States. In 2004, "the disease had left him unable to walk. But unwilling to endure a life of infirmity, Finney managed to regain his ability to balance on two feet, to walk – and eventually to run – through extensive rehabilitation therapy and new medications."

In 2003, British adventurer Sir Ranulph Fiennes completed seven marathons on seven continents in seven days. He completed this feat despite suffering from a heart attack and undergoing a double heart bypass operation just four months before. This feat has since been eclipsed by Irish ultramarathon runner Richard Donovan who in 2009 completed seven marathons on seven continents in under 132 hours (five and a half days). Starting 1 February 2012 he improved on this by completing the 7 on 7 in under 120 hours or in less than five days.

On 30 November 2013, 69-year-old Larry Macon set a Guinness World Record for Most Marathons Run in a Year by Man by running 238 marathons. Larry Macon celebrated his 1,000th career marathon at the Cowtown Marathon in Ft. Worth on 24 February 2013.

Other goals are to attempt to run marathons on a series of consecutive weekends (Richard Worley on 159 weekends), or to run the most marathons during a particular year or the most in a lifetime. A pioneer in running multiple marathons was Sy Mah of Toledo, Ohio, who ran 524 before he died in 1988. As of 30 June 2007, Horst Preisler of Germany had successfully completed 1214 marathons plus 347 ultramarathons, a total of 1561 events at marathon distance or longer. Sigrid Eichner, Christian Hottas and Hans-Joachim Meyer have also all completed over 1000 marathons each. Norm Frank of the United States is credited with 945 marathons.

Christian Hottas is meanwhile the first runner who ever completed 2000 marathons. He ran his 2000th at TUI Marathon Hannover on 5 May 2013 together with a group of more than 80 friends from 11 countries, including 8 officers from the 100 Marathons Clubs U.K., North-America, Germany, Denmark, Austria and Italy. Hottas completed his 2500th marathon on 4 December 2016.

In 2010, Stefaan Engels, a Belgian, set out to run the marathon distance every day of the year. Because of a foot injury he had to resort to a handcycle near the end of January 2010. However, on 5 February he was fully recovered and decided to reset the counter back to zero. By 30 March he broke the existing record of Akinori Kusuda, from Japan, who completed 52 marathons in a row in 2009. On 5 February 2011, Engels had run 365 marathon distances in as many days.
Ricardo Abad Martínez, from Spain, later ran 150 marathons in 150 consecutive days in 2009, and subsequently 500 marathons in a row, from October 2010 to February 2012.

Some runners compete to run the same marathons for the most consecutive years. For example, Johnny Kelley completed 58 Boston Marathons (he entered the race 61 times). Currently, the longest consecutive streak of Boston Marathon finishes—45 in a row—is held by Bennett Beach, of Bethesda, Maryland.

Olympic medalists

Men

Women

World Championships medalists

Men

Women

General participation 

Most participants do not run a marathon to win. More important for most runners is their personal finishing time and their placement within their specific gender and age group, though some runners just want to finish. Strategies for completing a marathon include running the whole distance and a run–walk strategy. In 2005, the average marathon time in the U.S. was 4 hours 32 minutes 8 seconds for men, 5 hours 6 minutes 8 seconds for women. In 2015, the men's and women's median marathon times were 4 hours 20 minutes 13 seconds and 4 hours 45 minutes 30 seconds respectively.

A goal many runners aim for is to break certain time barriers. For example, recreational first-timers often try to run the marathon under four hours; more competitive runners may attempt to finish under three hours. Other benchmarks are the qualifying times for major marathons. The Boston Marathon, the oldest marathon in the United States, requires a qualifying time for all non-professional runners. The New York City Marathon also requires a qualifying time for guaranteed entry, at a significantly faster pace than Boston's.

Typically, there is a maximum allowed time of about six hours after which the marathon route is closed, although some larger marathons keep the course open considerably longer (eight hours or more). Many marathons around the world have such time limits by which all runners must have crossed the finish line. Anyone slower than the limit will be picked up by a sweeper bus. In many cases the marathon organizers are required to reopen the roads to the public so that traffic can return to normal.

With the growth in popularity of marathon-running, many marathons across the United States and the world have been filling to capacity faster than ever before. When the Boston Marathon opened up registration for its 2011 running, the field capacity was filled within eight hours.

Training 

The long run is an important element in marathon training. More experienced marathoners may run a longer distance during the week. Greater weekly training mileages can offer greater results in terms of distance and endurance, but also carry a greater risk of training injury. It is recommended that those new to running should get a checkup from their doctor, as there are certain warning signs and risk factors that should be evaluated before undertaking any new workout program, especially marathon training.

Many training programs last a minimum of five or six months, with a gradual increase in the distance run and finally, for recovery, a period of tapering in the one to three weeks preceding the race. For beginners wishing to merely finish a marathon, a minimum of four months of running four days a week is recommended. Many trainers recommend a weekly increase in mileage of no more than 10%. It is also often advised to maintain a consistent running program for six weeks or so before beginning a marathon training program, to allow the body to adapt to the new stresses. The marathon training program itself would suppose variation between hard and easy training, with a periodization of the general plan.

Training programs can be found at the websites of Runner's World, Hal Higdon, Jeff Galloway, and the Boston Athletic Association, and in numerous other published sources, including the websites of specific marathons.

The last long training run might be undertaken up to two weeks prior to the event. Many marathon runners also "carbo-load" (increase carbohydrate intake while holding total caloric intake constant) during the week before the marathon to allow their bodies to store more glycogen.

Glycogen and "the wall" 

Carbohydrates that a person eats are converted by the liver and muscles into glycogen for storage. Glycogen burns rapidly to provide quick energy. Runners can store about 8 MJ or 2,000 kcal worth of glycogen in their bodies, enough for about 30 km/18–20 miles of running. Many runners report that running becomes noticeably more difficult at that point. When glycogen runs low, the body must then obtain energy by burning stored fat, which does not burn as readily. When this happens, the runner will experience dramatic fatigue and is said to "hit the wall". The aim of training for the marathon, according to many coaches, is to maximize the limited glycogen available so that the fatigue of the "wall" is not as dramatic. This is accomplished in part by utilizing a higher percentage of energy from burned fat even during the early phase of the race, thus conserving glycogen.

Carbohydrate-based "energy gels" are used by runners to avoid or reduce the effect of "hitting the wall", as they provide easy to digest energy during the run. Energy gels usually contain varying amounts of sodium and potassium and some also contain caffeine. They need to be consumed with a certain amount of water. Recommendations for how often to take an energy gel during the race range widely.

Alternatives to gels include various forms of concentrated sugars, and foods high in simple carbohydrates that can be digested easily. Many runners experiment with consuming energy supplements during training runs to determine what works best for them. Consumption of food while running sometimes makes the runner sick. Runners are advised not to ingest a new food or medicine just prior to or during a race. It is also important to refrain from taking any of the non-steroidal anti-inflammatory class of pain relievers (NSAIDs, e.g., aspirin, ibuprofen, naproxen), as these drugs may change the way the kidneys regulate their blood flow and may lead to serious kidney problems, especially in cases involving moderate to severe dehydration. NSAIDS block the COX-2 enzyme pathway to prevent the production of prostaglandins. These prostaglandins may act as inflammation factors throughout the body, but they also play a crucial role in maintenance of water retention. In less than 5% of the whole population that take NSAIDS, individuals may be more negatively sensitive to renal prostaglandin synthesis inhibition.

Temperature

A study of the performance of 1.8 million participants in the Berlin, London, Paris, Boston, Chicago, and New York marathons during the years from 2001 to 2010 found that runners recorded their fastest times when the temperature was around 6 °C (43 °F), with an increase of 10 °C (18 °F) leading to a 1.5% reduction in speed. A July 2020 study found that increasing temperatures affected faster runners' performance more than slower ones.

After a marathon 
Marathon participation may result in various medical, musculoskeletal, and dermatological complaints. Delayed onset muscle soreness (DOMS) is a common condition affecting runners during the first week following a marathon. Various types of mild exercise or massage have been recommended to alleviate pain secondary to DOMS. Dermatological issues frequently include "jogger's nipple", "jogger's toe", and blisters.

The immune system is reportedly suppressed for a short time. Changes to the blood chemistry may lead physicians to mistakenly diagnose heart malfunction.

After long training runs and the marathon itself, consuming carbohydrates to replace glycogen stores and protein to aid muscle recovery is commonly recommended. In addition, soaking the lower half of the body for approximately 20 minutes in cold or ice water may force blood through the leg muscles to speed recovery.

Health risks 

Marathon running has various health risks, though these can be diminished with preparation and care. Training and the races themselves can put runners under stress. While very rare, even death is a possibility during a race.

Common minor health risks include blisters, tendonitis, fatigue, knee or ankle sprain, dehydration (electrolyte imbalance), and other conditions. Many are categorised as overuse injuries.

Cardiac health 

In 2016, a systematic medical review found that the risk of sudden cardiac death during or immediately after a marathon was between 0.6 and 1.9 deaths per 100,000 participants, varying across the specific studies and the methods used, and not controlling for age or gender. Since the risk is small, cardiac screening programs for marathons are uncommon. However, this review was not an attempt to assess the overall cardiac health impact of marathon running.

A 2006 study of non-elite Boston Marathon participants tested runners for certain proteins that indicate heart damage or dysfunction (see Troponin) and gave them echocardiogram scans, before and after the marathon.

According to a Canadian study presented in 2010, running a marathon can temporarily result in decreased function of more than half the muscle segments in the heart's main pumping chamber, but neighboring segments are generally able to compensate. Full recovery is reached within three months. The fitter the runner, the less the effect. The marathon was held in  weather. According to one of the researchers: "Regular exercise reduces cardiovascular risk by a factor of two or three in the long run, but while we're doing vigorous exercise such as marathon running, our cardiac risk increases by seven."

Hydration 

Overconsumption is the most significant concern associated with water consumption during marathons. Drinking excessive amounts of fluid during a race can lead to dilution of sodium in the blood, a condition called exercise-associated hyponatremia, which may result in vomiting, seizures, coma and even death. Dr. Lewis G. Maharam, medical director for the New York City Marathon, stated in 2005: "There are no reported cases of dehydration causing death in the history of world running, but there are plenty of cases of people dying of hyponatremia."

For example, Dr. Cynthia Lucero died at the age of 28 while participating in the 2002 Boston Marathon. It was Lucero's second marathon. At mile 22, Lucero complained of feeling "dehydrated and rubber-legged." She soon wobbled and collapsed to the ground, and was unconscious by the time the paramedics reached her. Lucero was admitted to Brigham and Women's Hospital and died two days later.

Lucero's cause of death was determined to be hyponatremic encephalopathy, a condition that causes swelling of the brain due to an imbalance of sodium in the blood known as exercise-associated hyponatremia (EAH). While EAH is sometimes referred to as "water intoxication", Lucero drank large amounts of Gatorade during the race, demonstrating that runners who consume sodium-containing sports drinks in excess of thirst can still develop EAH. Because hyponatremia is caused by excessive water retention, and not just loss of sodium, consumption of sports drinks or salty foods may not prevent hyponatremia.

Women are more prone to hyponatremia than men. A study in the New England Journal of Medicine found that 13% of runners completing the 2002 Boston Marathon had hyponatremia.

The International Marathon Medical Directors Association (IMMDA) advised in 2006 that fluid intake should be adjusted individually according to factors such as body weight, sex, climate, pace, fitness (VO2 max), and sweat rate, as fluid requirements can vary between people depending on these variables. The IMMDA also recommended sports drinks that include carbohydrates and electrolytes instead of plain water and said that runners should "drink to thirst", trying to refrain from drinking at every fluid station before feeling thirsty. Heat exposure leads to diminished thirst drive and thirst may not be a sufficient incentive to drink in many situations. The IMMDA and HSL Harpur Hill give recommendations to drink fluid in small volumes frequently at an approximate rate falling between  every 15 minutes. A patient suffering hyponatremia can be given a small volume of a concentrated salt solution intravenously to raise sodium concentrations in the blood. Some runners weigh themselves before running and write the results on their bibs. If anything goes wrong, first aid workers can use the weight information to tell if the patient had consumed too much water.

Body temperature 
Exertional heat stroke is an emergency condition in which thermoregulation fails and the body temperature rises dangerously above . It becomes a greater risk in warm and humid weather, even for young and fit individuals. Treatment requires rapid physical cooling of the body.

Charity involvement 

Some charities seek to associate with various races. Some marathon organizers set aside a portion of their limited entry slots for charity organizations to sell to members in exchange for donations. Runners are given the option to sign up to run particular races, especially when marathon entries are no longer available to the general public.

In some cases, charities organize their own marathon as a fund-raiser, gaining funds via entry fees or through sponsorships.

Culture
 Mars rover marathon

In 2015 the Mars rover Opportunity attained the distance of a marathon from its starting location on Mars, and the valley where it achieved this distance was called Marathon Valley, which was then explored.

See also 

Records
 Marathon world record progression
 National records in the marathon
Lists
 List of marathon races
 List of marathoners
 List of marathon national champions (men)

 List of non-professional marathon runners
Related races
 Ekiden (marathon relays)
 Half marathon
 Ultramarathon
Other endurance races
 Ironman Triathlon
 Mountain marathon
 Multi-day race
 Ski marathon
Organizations
 100 Marathon Club
 World Peace Marathon
Notable races
 Ineos 1:59 Challenge
 Man versus Horse Marathon 
 Marathons at the Paralympics

Other related topics
 Pacemaker (running)
 Physiology of marathons

Notes

References

Bibliography 
 Hans-Joachim Gehrke, "From Athenian identity to European ethnicity: The cultural biography of the myth of Marathon," in Ton Derks, Nico Roymans (ed.), Ethnic Constructs in Antiquity: The Role of Power and Tradition (Amsterdam, Amsterdam University Press, 2009) (Amsterdam Archaeological Studies, 13), 85–100.
 Hans W. Giessen: Mythos Marathon. Von Herodot über Bréal bis zur Gegenwart. (= Landauer Schriften zur Kommunikations- und Kulturwissenschaft. Band 17). Verlag Empirische Pädagogik, Landau 2010
 Tom Derderian, Boston Marathon: History of the World's Premier Running Event, Human Kinetics, 1994, 1996

External links 

 IAAF list of marathon records in XML

 

Road running distances
Athletic culture based on Greek antiquity
Greek inventions
Long-distance running distances
Summer Olympic disciplines in athletics